Bundang Senior High School (Korean: 분당고등학교, Hanja: 盆唐高等學校), commonly referred to as Bundang Senior High School, is a co-educational, comprehensive, community high school located in Bundang, South Korea as part of the Seongnam public schools.

As of the 2015 school year, the school has an enrollment of 1,297 students and 80 classroom teachers (for a student-teacher ratio of 16.2).  Prior to 2005, the school was ranked second in selectivity among its fifteen peer schools (district metrics were abolished that year and school admission reorganized into a lottery in accordance with the elimination of the high school entrance exams).

Location
Bundang High School is situated near the Tancheon tributary, in Sunae (neighborhood), Bundang (district), Seongnam (city), Gyeonggi (province), 330 meters southeast of Sunae Station on the Bundang Line (yellow line), and 500 meters west-southwest of Bundang Central Park.  The school is 20 kilometers southeast of downtown Seoul.

University Admission
Despite district realignment in 2005, Bundang matriculates students each year to all three SKY universities, to pre-medical and pre-dentistry programs (의치계열), and to the most selective teachers college (교대).  For 2005-2010 the school graduated a total of fifteen students to KAIST, Postech, the military academy (사관학교), and Japan's top engineering programs (일본공대).

Sister School
Naemyeon High School, Hongcheon, Gangwon-do (1999)

Notes

See also
 Bundang
 Bundang HS Debating Club
 Education in Korea
 Korean-version Wiki 
 Seongnam Office of Education

 

High schools in South Korea
Educational institutions established in 1992
1992 establishments in South Korea